Afovirsen is an oligonucleotide capable of antisense interactions with mRNA of human papillomavirus. It has been investigated as a tool for diagnostics and therapeutics.

Nucleic acid sequence
Afovirsen consists of a sequence of 20 nucleic acids

References

Antiviral drugs
Antisense RNA